This is a list of islands of Ethiopia.

Lake Abaya 
Islands of Lake Abaya:
 Aghise Island
 Alge Island
 Aruro Island
 Darato Island
 Gatame Island
 Gidicho Island
 Ugayo Island

Lake Afrera 
Island(s) of Lake Afrera:
 Franchetti Island

Lake Shala 
Island(s) of Lake Shala:
 Pelican Island

Lake Tana 
Islands of Lake Tana:
 Daga Island
 Dek Island
 Gelila Zakarias
 Kebran Island
 Mitraha Island
 Rema Island
 Tana Qirqos

Lake Ziway 
Islands of Lake Ziway:
 Bird Island
 Debre Sina
 Funduro
 Galila
 Tadecha
 Tulu Gudo

See also 
 Geography of Ethiopia

References 

Islands
Ethiopia